Wendy Lowenstein (born Katherin Wendy Robertson Lowenstein; 1927—2006) was an Australian historian, author, and teacher notable for her recording of people's everyday experiences and her advocacy of social activism. She pioneered oral history in Australia, with Weevils in the Flour in 1978 but she began collecting folklore and oral histories of early Australian working life in the 1960s.

Lowenstein experienced working life in different industries: as a proofreader, print and radio journalist, full-time mother, folklore collector, a teacher-librarian, a writer, an oral historian, and a public speaker on working life and self-publishing.

Oral history recordings
The Lowenstein Oral History Collection consists of at least 741 hours of interviews recorded between 1969 and 1999. The interviews in the collection cover a diverse range of topics from the social effects of the 1930s Depression and working life in Australia to Children's Rhymes and Australian folklore from pearl luggers and the Gurindji strike and walk-off in Wave Hill to the Patrick's Waterside dispute at Melbourne Docklands in 1998.

Topics recorded

Australian outback interviews — 1969 (109 work(s); 126 hours).  Recorded during a year-long collecting trip in 1969, Many of the interviews were used as material for "Weevils in the Flour".  Copies are held in the Lowenstein Family Collection (LFC), the National Library, the State Library of Victoria and some recordings are also available in libraries in Western Australia and Queensland.
Australian Folklore and Social History [1968–1972]  
 1930's Depression in Australia  
 Melbourne waterside workers 60 work(s); 60 hours  d 
 Communists and the left in the arts and community  99 work(s); 125 hours;  
 Oral history of childhood 5 work(s); 9 hours  
 Robe river / pekoe wallsend industrial dispute 
 Changes to working life in Australia — 1990s 
 Wonthaggi coal mining interviews

Published works based on oral history recordings
Lowenstein is chiefly known for her written oral histories, which include The Immigrants 1977, Weevils in the Flour 1978, and Under The Hook 1992. She is less well known for her recordings of  Australian folklore and her  interviews with everyday people about Australian working life. Her work concentrates on early manual laboring industries such as coal mining, cane cutting, northern cattle station work, waterside workers, and the pearling industry. Lowenstein sought to record the worker's perspective in a range of industrial dispute.

 The Immigrants  by Wendy Lowenstein and Morag Loh, Hyland House, Melbourne, 1977.  This book tells the experiences of 17 immigrants who came to Australia in living memory, who tell their story in their own words. Foreword by Henry Mayer, University of Sydney states  "It is the authors' achievement to have translated these immigrant and human voices into vivid print."
 Weevils in the flour: An oral record of the 1930s depression in Australia   by Wendy Lowenstein, Hyland House/Scribe 1978   is Lowenstein's best-known book. The foreword was written by Manning Clark. Published in 1978, it was an immediate best seller and was awarded the Royal Blind Society's first Talking Book of the  Year in 1980.   Russel Ward, reviewing the book in "The Age" said, "This great book on the depression is so good, it is impossible to praise it sufficiently without sounding absurd."
 Under the hook: Melbourne Waterside Workers'Remember 1900–1998, by Wendy Lowenstein & Tom Hills Bookworkers Press.  An oral history written in the words of the rank and file wharfies. Whilst interviewing for Weevils in the Flour, Lowenstein met veteran Melbourne wharfie Tom Hills. With Hills collaboration "Under the Hook: Melbourne waterside workers remember 1900–1998", was self-published under her Bookworkers' Press imprint.  The first edition covered 1900-1990.  A revised and updated 2nd edition of    included interviews during the "Patricks" dispute of 1998. " ." (The making of this history of working on the Melbourne waterfront was featured in  "Lowenstein and Hills", an episode of ABC Big Country 
 Weevils at work  includes the 80 interviews Lowenstein recorded in Pannawonica and Robe River in 1986 – 1988 during the Pekoe Wallsend industrial dispute. These recordings give a vivid picture of working life, changes in working conditions, family life, and the community e  affected by the prolonged dispute in Robe River W.A.

Miscellaneous publications 

 Shocking Shocking Shocking by Wendy Lowenstein 19?? A self-published collection of improper Australian children's play-rhymes. She was co-author of Cinderella Dressed in Yella (with Ian Turner and June  Factor,  Heinneman).  The rhymes Lowenstein collected, when included  Cinderella Dressed in Yella, led to the first edition being banned from the post
 Self Publishing Without Pain by Wendy Lowenstein with M.Saint-Ferjeux, 1990 ( self-published)
 Ron Edwards  a short life of Edwards, published in AARL, March 1992.

Social activism
Lowenstein was a social activist most of her life. In 1955, she co-founded the Folk Lore Society of Victoria with Ian Turner and she contributed to and edited the Folk Lore Society of Victoria's magazine Gumsucker's Gazette, later Australian Tradition, for fifteen years. Shirley Andrews (Chairperson) and Lowenstein worked together on the committee which organised the first Festival was held in Melbourne in 1967.

She worked voluntarily for organisations such as People for Nuclear Disarmament and Arts Action for Peace, and protested vigorously whenever she felt funding cutbacks affected culture and the Arts.

Tributes

 Richard Lowenstein, "An ear for the ordinary folk: Wendy Lowenstein, 1927–2006" The Sydney Morning Herald, 26 October 2006
 Richard Lowenstein – Video Memorial.
 Phyl Lobl "Wendy Lowenstein, 1927–2006: A Woman of Worth"
 June Factor "Dedicated worker with Words"
 Professor Henry Mayer, University of Sydney in his foreword to "The Immigrants"
 Mark Gregory "Wendy Katherin Lowenstein (25 June 1927 – 16 October 2006)

References

External links
Lowenstein, Katherin Wendy nee Robertson

1927 births
2006 deaths
Oral history
Marxist writers
Australian folk musicians
20th-century Australian musicians
Communist Party of Australia members